Wigglesworth may refer to:

People
Bunny Wigglesworth, a character in the 1981 film, Zorro, The Gay Blade
Cecil Wigglesworth (1893–1961), an English RAF officer and cricketer
Cindy Wigglesworth, an author on the subject of spiritual intelligence
Edward Wigglesworth (disambiguation), a name for a number of people
Gillian Wigglesworth, an Australian linguist
Mark Wigglesworth (born 1964), a British music conductor
Michael Wigglesworth (1631–1705), a New England Puritan minister and poet
Philip Wigglesworth (1896–1975), an Air Marshal in the Royal Air Force
Richard Wigglesworth (rugby union) (born 1983), an English rugby union player
Richard B. Wigglesworth (1891–1960), an American football player and coach and U.S. Representative from Massachusetts
Ryan Wigglesworth (born 1979), a composer, conductor and pianist born in Yorkshire, England
Smith Wigglesworth (1859–1947), a British evangelist
Tom Wigglesworth, a candidate in the 1995 Ontario provincial election
Vincent Wigglesworth (1899–1994), a British entomologist and discoverer of prothoracicotropic hormone (PTTH)
Wigglesworthia glossinidia, the bacterium named for him
Frank Wigglesworth Clarke (1847–1931), an American scientist, sometimes known as the "Father of Geochemistry"
Wigglesworth Dole (1779–1845), patriarch of an influential American family
Kelly Wiglesworth (born 1977), a contestant in the CBS reality series Survivor: Borneo
Helen Worth (born Cathryn Helen Wigglesworth in 1951), an English actress
Claire Wigglesworth, born 2001, Harvard College social media intern
A prominent Boston Brahmin family

Places
Wigglesworth, a village and civil parish in North Yorkshire, England
Wigglesworth Building, a historic building in Boston
Wigglesworth Hall, a dormitory at Harvard College
Wigglesworth Hall, home to the history department at Milton Academy

Other
R v Wigglesworth, a 1987 Supreme Court of Canada decision on the constitutional right against double jeopardy

See also